In the mathematical field of graph theory, the friendship graph (or Dutch windmill graph or -fan)  is a planar, undirected graph with  vertices and  edges.

The friendship graph  can be constructed by joining  copies of the cycle graph  with a common vertex, which becomes a universal vertex for the graph.

By construction, the friendship graph  is isomorphic to the windmill graph . It is unit distance with girth 3, diameter 2 and radius 1. The graph  is isomorphic to the butterfly graph.

Friendship theorem
The friendship theorem of  states that the finite graphs with the property that every two vertices have exactly one neighbor in common are exactly the friendship graphs. Informally, if a group of people has the property that every pair of people has exactly one friend in common, then there must be one person who is a friend to all the others. However, for infinite graphs, there can be many different graphs with the same cardinality that have this property.

A combinatorial proof of the friendship theorem was given by Mertzios and Unger. Another proof was given by Craig Huneke. A formalised proof in Metamath was reported by Alexander van der Vekens in October 2018 on the Metamath mailing list.

Labeling and colouring
The friendship graph has chromatic number 3 and chromatic index . Its chromatic polynomial can be deduced from the chromatic polynomial of the cycle graph  and is equal to 
.

The friendship graph  is edge-graceful if and only if  is odd.

Every friendship graph is factor-critical.

Extremal graph theory
According to extremal graph theory, every graph with sufficiently many edges (relative to its number of vertices) must contain a -fan as a subgraph. More specifically, this is true for an -vertex graph if the number of edges is

where  is  if  is odd, and
 is  if  is even. These bounds generalize Turán's theorem on the number of edges in a triangle-free graph, and they are the best possible bounds for this problem, in that for any smaller number of edges there exist graphs that do not contain a -fan.

References 

Parametric families of graphs
Planar graphs